SMS Prinz Heinrich was a unique German armored cruiser built at the turn of the 20th century for the German Kaiserliche Marine (Imperial Navy), named after Kaiser Wilhelm II's younger brother Prince Heinrich. The second vessel of that type built in Germany, Prinz Heinrich was constructed at the Kaiserliche Werft (Imperial Shipyard) in Kiel, being laid down in December 1898, launched in March 1900, and commissioned in March 1902. Prinz Heinrichs design was a modification of the previous armored cruiser, and traded a smaller main battery and thinner armor for higher speed. All subsequent German armored cruisers were incremental developments of Prinz Heinrich.

Prinz Heinrich served with the German fleet in home waters for just four years, from 1902 to 1906, when she was withdrawn from front-line service. During this period, she served as the flagship of the fleet's scouting forces, and she was primarily occupied with fleet training. The ship was out of service from early 1906 to mid-1908, when she was reactivated for use as a gunnery training ship, a role she filled until late 1912. Prinz Heinrich underwent modernization and conversion into a dedicated training ship in 1914, and the work was completed just before the outbreak of World War I in July that year.

After the outbreak of war, the ship was reactivated for active service, initially with III Scouting Group with the High Seas Fleet. Prinz Heinrich was used for coastal defense in the North Sea and she participated in the fleet sortie that supported the Raid on Scarborough, Hartlepool and Whitby in December 1914. After the naval command determined that Prinz Heinrich was too old to serve in the North Sea against the powerful British Royal Navy, she was transferred to the Baltic Sea in early 1915. She supported offensive minelaying operations and patrolled the central Baltic for Russian forces, but never encountered hostile forces. She provided gunfire support during the attack on Libau in May 1915 and shelled Russian positions during the Battle of the Gulf of Riga in August. In the face of severe crew shortages in late 1915, Prinz Heinrich had her crew reduced and was ultimately decommissioned and disarmed in March 1916. She thereafter served in a variety of secondary roles for the rest of the war, before being broken up in 1920.

Design

Prinz Heinrich, the second armored cruiser built in Germany, was authorized under the 1898 Naval Law, the first naval construction program begun under the direction of Alfred von Tirpitz, the State Secretary of the Reichsmarineamt (Imperial Naval Office). The design for Prinz Heinrich was prepared in the late 1890s while construction of the first vessel, was still underway. Some older naval historians, including Hugh Lyon and John Taylor, writing in 1979 and 1969, respectively, have stated that Prinz Heinrich was intended for overseas service, but Aidan Dodson points out that the ship's hull was not sheathed with wood and copper or zinc layers, which would have been necessary for any ship deployed overseas where shipyard facilities would not be readily available. Dodson also noted that the ship never actually went abroad on an extended deployment.

Weight reduction was achieved in part by thinning the ship's armor layout, though advances in steel technology meant this was not actually a compromise and her armor layout was in fact significantly more effective than Fürst Bismarcks. Krupp had recently developed cemented armor plate, which was considerably stronger than earlier Harvey armor, so less of it could be used to achieve the same level of protection. In addition, the belt could be made taller, extending up to the main deck level, which protected more of the ship's interior. The ship's deck armor sloped down on the sides, where it was connected to the lower edge of the belt, which considerably strengthened the protection system by providing another layer of armor that would need to be penetrated before the ship's vitals could be damaged.

The armament was also significantly reduced to save weight and cost, from four heavy guns in two twin-gun turrets to two guns, each in single turrets; she also received two fewer secondary guns compared to Fürst Bismarck. But rather than spreading the secondary battery along the length of the hull in casemates and sponsons, they were concentrated in a battery amidships, which reduced the amount of the hull that needed to be protected with armor, further saving weight and allowing thicker armor to be concentrated in the battery. Further weight savings were achieved by adopting a smaller superstructure and discarding heavy military masts in favor of lighter pole masts. Her engines, however, were some  more powerful, which produced a faster vessel. 

The ship proved to be an influential design, and all subsequent German armored cruisers were developments of Prinz Heinrich. Nevertheless, she was not without critics; Vizeadmiral (VAdm—Vice Admiral) Albert Hopman referred to the ship as "cheap, but bad" in his memoirs Logbuch eines Seeoffiziers (Log of a Sea Officer). The naval historians Hans Hildebrand, Albert Röhr, and Hans-Otto Steinmetz regard Hopman's criticism as an exaggeration, pointing out that Prinz Heinrich compared well to foreign contemporaries like the French , the Russian , and the Italian , though she was inferior to British designs. She nevertheless spent only four years in active service in peacetime before being replaced with newer, more powerful cruisers.

Dimensions and machinery

The hull was constructed with transverse and longitudinal steel frames, and incorporated thirteen watertight compartments and a double bottom that extended for 57 percent of the length of the ship. The German navy considered the ship to be a good sea boat with gentle motion, though she suffered from severe roll. Prinz Heinrich was crewed by 35 officers and 532 enlisted men. For the duration of her career as the second command flagship of the Cruiser Division, the standard crew was augmented by an additional nine officers and 44 enlisted men. She carried a number of smaller vessels, including two picket boats, a launch, a pinnace, two cutters, two yawls, and two dinghies.

The boilers were ducted into two funnels amidships.

Armament

Prinz Heinrich was armed with a variety of weapons. Her primary armament consisted of two  SK L/40 quick-firing guns mounted in single turrets, one on either end of the superstructure. A secondary battery of ten  SK L/40 quick-firing guns rounded out her offensive armament. Six of these guns were mounted in amidships casemates on either side of the vessel, and the remaining four were mounted in turrets in the ship's hull above the casemates. These guns were supplied with 120 rounds each.

The cruiser carried ten  SK L/30 quick-firing guns for defense against torpedo boats. Each of these guns was supplied with 250 shells. The ship's gun armament was rounded out by four autocannons, though these were subsequently removed. The ship was also fitted with four  torpedo tubes. One was mounted on the stern in a swivel mount, one was mounted submerged in the bow, and one was placed submerged in the hull on either side abreast of the forward gun turret.

Armor
Prinz Heinrich was protected by Krupp armor. The entire length of the belt was backed by equal thicknesses of teak planks. The aft conning tower was much less thoroughly protected; it was covered by only  of steel plating. The main battery gun turrets had 150 mm-thick sides and 30 mm-thick roofs. The 15 cm gun turrets had 100 mm-thick armor, while the casemated weapons were protected by  gun shields. The casemates themselves were armored with 100 mm worth of steel plating.

Service history

Peacetime career

Prinz Heinrich was laid down on 1 December 1898 at the Kaiserliche Werft (Imperial Shipyard) in Kiel. She was launched on 22 March 1900, when she was christened by Princess Heinrich of Prussia; the ship's namesake, her husband Prince Heinrich of Prussia, was present at the ceremony, and the Generalinspekteur der Marine (General Inspector of the Navy), Admiral Hans von Koester, gave a speech. The ship was completed just under two years later, on 11 March 1902. She then began sea trials that lasted until June, at which point she joined the reconnaissance forces attached to I Squadron. She took part in the training activities in the squadron, including a training cruise in Norwegian waters from 8 to 20 July. In August, she escorted Kaiser Wilhelm II aboard his yacht Hohenzollern during a trip to meet Czar Nicholas II of Russia in Reval. After the conclusion of the maneuvers on 18 September, the pre-dreadnought battleship  was decommissioned for maintenance; the ship had been serving as the flagship of Konteradmiral (KAdm—Rear Admiral) Curt von Prittwitz und Gaffron, the deputy commander of the squadron. While the ship was out of service, Prittwitz und Gaffron transferred to Prinz Heinrich, though he remained there only briefly before he was replaced by KAdm Ludwig Borckenhagen on 1 October. Prinz Heinrich and the rest of the squadron ended the year with a winter training cruise, during which she tried to pull the new battleship  free on 17 December after she ran aground in the Great Belt.

The 1900 Naval Law created the position of Commander of Scouting Forces, and Borckenhagen became the first person to fill the role. He therefore remained aboard Prinz Heinrich, which became the flagship of the Reconnaissance Force on 1 March 1903. Prinz Heinrich, the protected cruiser , and the light cruisers  and  conducted training maneuvers beginning in April. On 12 April, they were joined by the light cruiser ; by 2 May they had also been joined by the light cruisers  and Niobe. The ships took part in the autumn fleet maneuvers in August and September, after which Borckenhagen was replaced by KAdm Gustav Schmidt. Prinz Heinrich participated in the fleet training activities of 1903, which included a visit to Spain from 7 May to 10 August. During the cruise, she stayed in Vigo, Spain from 20 to 30 May. After returning to Germany, the fleet then conducted its annual training exercises, which concluded on 22 September. On 25 January 1904, Prinz Heinrich went to help the Norwegian town of Ålesund in the aftermath of a fire that had caused extensive destruction. In mid-1904, the new armored cruiser  joined the Reconnaissance Force. The typical autumn maneuvers took place in August and September, during which Prinz Heinrich won the Kaiser's Schiesspreis (Shooting Prize) for excellent accuracy for large cruisers. On 3 December, Schmidt transferred his flag to Friedrich Carl.

The year 1905 passed without incident, following the same routine as previous years. From 11 March to 20 June, Prinz Heinrich again served as Schmidt's flagship, as Friedrich Carl was occupied with escorting Hohenzollern on a trip abroad. In early July, Prinz Heinrich experimented with a new coaling apparatus; further tests were made with it in November and February 1906. She visited Uddevalla and Södertälje in Sweden in mid-1905. She had another stint as flagship from 10 to 26 August while Friedrich Carl was in dry dock for maintenance. On 1 October, the position of Deputy Commander of Scouting Forces was created, and Prinz Heinrichs commander, Kapitän zur See (KzS—Captain at Sea) Raimund Winkler became the first to fill the role. In March 1906, the ship was removed from the reconnaissance forces, her place having been taken by Friedrich Carl, which had in turn been replaced by the new armored cruiser . By this time, Prinz Heinrich had spent just four years on active service with the fleet.

Prinz Heinrich spent two years in reserve when she was reactivated on 15 May 1908 to replace the old gunnery training ship . She went to Sonderburg on 22 June, where the Naval Artillery Inspectorate was located. Over the next four years, Prinz Heinrich largely remained in port where she trained gunners for the fleet until she was replaced by the armored cruiser  in October 1912. Prinz Heinrich was decommissioned again on 31 October; a year later, in November 1913, the Reichsmarineamt began exploring the possibility of converting the ship into a dedicated training vessel, and the naval command decided that it should still be possible to use the vessel as a warship in the event of an emergency. In early 1914, Prinz Heinrich went into dry dock at the Kaiserliche Werft in Kiel for the conversion. The arrangement of the searchlights was modified, the superstructure deck bulwark was removed, and the masts were modernized. Conversion work was completed just before the outbreak of World War I in July 1914.

World War I
Following the wave of declarations of war between the major European powers at the end of July and early August, Britain declared war on Germany on 5 August. Prinz Heinrich was reactivated for wartime service the same day, and she then went into the shipyard in Kiel for preparation work. She was then assigned to the defenses of the port in advance of an expected British attack on Kiel on 25–26 September. When that failed to materialize, Prinz Heinrich was assigned to III Scouting Group, part of the High Seas Fleet. From 8 November to 14 April 1915, Prinz Heinrich was primarily occupied with guard duty in the Jade Bay and the river Ems. During this period, she participated in the second major German offensive in the North Sea, the operation to bombard Hartlepool on 15–16 December 1914. The main fleet was providing distant cover to Rear Admiral Franz von Hipper's battlecruisers, which were conducting the bombardment. During the night of the 15th, the German battle fleet of some twelve dreadnoughts and eight pre-dreadnoughts came to within  of an isolated squadron of six British battleships. However, skirmishes between the rival destroyer screens in the darkness convinced von Ingenohl that he was faced with the entire Grand Fleet. Under orders from Kaiser Wilhelm II to avoid risking the fleet unnecessarily, von Ingenohl broke off the engagement and turned the battle fleet back toward Germany.

After the operation, it was determined that the twelve-year-old Prinz Heinrich had no place in operations against the powerful British Grand Fleet. Accordingly, on 12 April 1915, III Scouting Group was detached from the High Seas Fleet and the ships were transferred to the Baltic Sea to operate against the Russian Baltic Fleet. On 15 April, the ships arrived in Kiel, where they came under command of then-KAdm Hopman, the commander of scouting forces in the Baltic. Hopman was then in the process of planning a major attack on Libau in conjunction with an attempt by the German Army to seize the city. They were escorted by a number of destroyers, torpedo boats, and minesweepers. The IV Scouting Group of the High Seas Fleet was detached from the North Sea to provide cover for the operation. The bombardment went as planned, though the destroyer  struck a mine in Libau's harbor, which blew off her bow and destroyed the ship. German ground forces were successful in their assault however, and took the city.

Prinz Heinrich supported a minelaying operation off the coast of Finland over the course of 23–26 May. From 3 to 5 June, Prinz Heinrich participated in a sortie into the Gulf of Finland. She supported another minelaying operation from 20 to 23 June. On 1 July, the minelayer , escorted by the cruisers Roon, Augsburg, and Lübeck and seven destroyers, laid a minefield north of Bogskär. While returning to port, the flotilla separated into two sections; Augsburg, Albatross, and three destroyers made for Rixhöft while the remainder of the unit went to Libau. Augsburg and Albatross were intercepted by a powerful Russian squadron commanded by Rear Admiral Bakhirev, consisting of three armored and two light cruisers. Commodore Johannes von Karpf, the flotilla commander, ordered the slower Albatross to steam for neutral Swedish waters and recalled Roon and Lübeck. Albatross was grounded off Gotland and Augsburg escaped, and the Russian squadron briefly engaged Roon before both sides broke contact. Upon being informed of the situation, Hopman sortied with Prinz Heinrich and Prinz Adalbert to support Karpf. While en route, the cruisers encountered the British submarine , which scored a hit on Prinz Adalbert. Hopman broke off the operation and returned to port with the damaged cruiser.

From 11 to 12 July, Prinz Heinrich participated in a sortie toward Gotska Sandön, though the Germans failed to locate any Russian warships. Another sweep into the central Baltic, between Libau and Gotland, took place on 1 to 2 August that again did not result in combat. German naval forces in the Baltic were reinforced by elements of the High Seas Fleet during the Battle of the Gulf of Riga in early August 1915. The Germans sought to drive out the Russians in the Gulf of Riga and to lay defensive minefields that would prevent a Russian counterattack. The battleships of the I Battle Squadron were the primary force, though Prinz Heinrich and the rest of the older vessels assigned to the Baltic fleet participated. On 10 August, Prinz Heinrich and Roon bombarded Russian defenses at Zerel, on the southernmost tip of the Sworbe Peninsula on the island of Ösel. Several Russian destroyers were anchored off Zerel, and were caught unawares by the German bombardment. Prinz Heinrich and Roon damaged one of the destroyers during their attack. A combination of tenacious Russian defense and reports of British submarines in the area—proved by the torpedoing of the battlecruiser  on 19 August—caused the German navy to break off the operation.

In the meantime, Prinz Heinrichs boiler tubes were in need of replacement, so she was detached for repairs at Kiel, where she arrived on 11 August. Repairs were completed the following month, and she arrived back in Libau on 22 September. She took part in another minelaying sortie into the Baltic in the direction of Östergarn on 5–6 October. By this time, the German navy had begun to experience severe crew shortages, and so the Reichsmarineamt decided to decommission older, less combat-capable vessels. On 10 November, Prinz Heinrich left Libau for Kiel, where she arrived the following day. Her crew was reduced and she was assigned to the "Readiness Division" with Wittelsbach, and she remained there until 27 March 1916, when she was decommissioned and disarmed. For the rest of the war, she served as a floating headquarters for Prince Heinrich, the commander in chief of naval forces in the Baltic. She was also used as a barracks ship and a tender. Beginning in 1918, she was also used to support the U-Kreuzer Flotilla. She was stricken from the naval register on 25 January 1920 and sold later that year. The ship was ultimately broken up for scrap at Audorf-Rendsburg.

Notes

Footnotes

Citations

References

Further reading
 

Cruisers of the Imperial German Navy
Ships built in Kiel
1900 ships
World War I cruisers of Germany